Je Suis Auto is an upcoming Austrian social science fiction indie comedy film directed by Juliana Neuhuber and written by Johannes Grenzfurthner. 
Chase Masterson is voicing the title character "Auto", a self-driving taxi,. Johannes Grenzfurthner plays Herbie Fuchsel, an unemployed nerd critical of artificial intelligence. The film is a farcical comedy that deals with issues such as artificial intelligence, politics of labor, and tech culture.

The film is distributed by monochrom.

Synopsis 
The film's plot is currently unknown, but it is confirmed that the story starts with an ill-tempered mafioso who needs to deliver a suitcase full of money. He enters a self-driving taxi to get to his destination but doesn't know that his ride is ontologically challenged.

Cast 
 Chase Masterson
 Johannes Grenzfurthner
 Jason Scott
 Florian Sebastian Fitz
 Boris Popovic
 Aaron Hillis
The film features several cameo appearances by Austrian media personalities such as Chris Lohner, Eva Billisich, Conny Lee, and Joesi Prokopetz.

Production 
In June 2018, monochrom announced at their event monocon that they are working on a new science fiction comedy film.

The script was written by Grenzfurthner, who has been working in the field of artificial intelligence and art before, for example lecturing at the Royal United Services Institute, or by publishing books about the subject.

Principal photography on the film began in August 2018, in cooperation with the production team of Traum und Wahnsinn. Directory of Photography was Thomas Weilguny, with whom Neuhuber and Grenzfurthner have frequently worked.

Chase Masterson recorded her voice part in Vienna in November 2018.

References

External links 

Official page
Jason Scott talking about acting in "Je Suis Auto"

Upcoming films
Austrian comedy films
Films shot in Austria
Monochrom
Nerd culture
Hacker culture
Political comedy films
Films about kidnapping
Films about automobiles
Films about computing
Films about technological impact
Films about artificial intelligence
Postcyberpunk films
Transhumanism in film
Utopian films
Social science fiction films
Films about criticism and refusal of work
Films set in Austria
Films set in Vienna
Absurdist fiction